Larry Jent (born December 20, 1951) is a politician and a former Democratic member of the Montana Legislature. He served in the Montana House of Representatives from 2001 to 2007, and served in the Montana Senate from 2007 to 2015.

Early life, education, and early career
Jent was born in 1951 in Nashville, Tennessee. He earned his BS from United States Military Academy in 1973. He went on to receive his JD from the University of Colorado Law School in 1983. Jent has served in the Montana Army National Guard. He was a Fishing Guide for Bud Lilly's Trout Shop/Ray's Tackle Shop from 1980 to 1983. He was then a Sole Practitioner from 1983 to 1987. He has been Partner for Williams and Jent, Limited Liability Partnership since 1987.

1996 congressional election

In 1996, incumbent Democrat U.S. Congressman Pat Williams of Montana's At-large congressional district decided to retire. Jent was one of four Democrat candidates to run for the seat. Former State Senator Bill Yellowtail won the Democratic primary with 56% of the vote. Jent ranked last with just 10% of the vote.

Montana legislature

Elections
In 2000, Jent was elected to the Montana House of Representatives to the Bozeman-based 29th House District. He defeated Republican Sandra Lee Smiley 66%-33%. In the 2000 U.S. Senate election, Democrat Brian Schweitzer carried the district with 65% of the vote. In 2002, he was re-elected with 69% against Dustin L. Stewart. After redistricting in 2004, Jent ran in the newly redrawn 64th House District and defeated Republican Page Lutes with 56% of the vote.

In 2006, he decided to retire from his seat to run for the Montana Senate. In the Bozeman-based 32nd Senate District, he defeated Republican Art Wittich 56%-44%. In 2010, he won re-election to a second term defeating Republican Michael B. Comstock 54%-46%.

Committee assignments
Fish and Game
Judiciary
State Administration

2012 gubernatorial election

In April 2011, Jent filed paperwork to run for Governor of Montana, but dropped out in March 2012, months before the primary.

2016 Attorney General election
Jent ran for Attorney General of Montana. He was unopposed in the Democratic primary and lost in a landslide in the general election with 32% of the vote, to the incumbent Tim Fox's 68%.

References

External links
Montana Senate - Larry Jent official MT State Legislature website
Project Vote Smart - Senator Larry Jent (MT) profile
Follow the Money - Larry Jent
2006 2004 2002 2000 1994 1992 1990 campaign contributions

Democratic Party Montana state senators
Democratic Party members of the Montana House of Representatives
1951 births
Living people
Politicians from Nashville, Tennessee